2010 saw the 7th edition of the Yemeni Unity Cup. The competition started in February and is set to conclude in May.

Round 3

|colspan="3" style="background-color:#99CCCC"|13 March 2010

|-
|colspan="3" style="background-color:#99CCCC"|14 March 2010

|-
|colspan="3" style="background-color:#99CCCC"|20 March 2010

|-
|colspan="3" style="background-color:#99CCCC"|22 March 2010

|-
|colspan="3" style="background-color:#99CCCC"|28 March 2010

|-
|colspan="3" style="background-color:#99CCCC"|17 April 2010

|-
|}

Quarter-finals

|colspan="3" style="background-color:#99CCCC"|27 April 2010

|-
|colspan="3" style="background-color:#99CCCC"|9 May 2010

|}

References

External links 
 Unity Cup results RSSSF
 Unity Cup results Goalzz

 

Yemeni Unity Cup
Unity